Engro Energy Limited (formerly Engro Powergen Limited) The story of Engro Energy goes back to 2008, when a fully owned subsidiary was incorporated by conglomerate Engro Corporation to develop power projects in Pakistan and beyond.

Engro PowerGen 
Their first intervention in the energy sphere was launched in the form of Engro Powergen Qadirpur Limited which owns and operates a 217 MW power plant in Qadirpur, Ghotki and runs on permeate gas which was previously being flared. This unique aspect makes the Engro Powergen Qadirpur plant one of the few green power plants in Pakistan earning carbon credits.

Engro Energy Thar Projects 
Engro Energy formed the Sindh Engro Coal Mining Company in collaboration with its partners to unearth and mine one of the world’s largest lignite coal reserves in Thar. Soon thereafter, the Company ventured into establishment of 2×330 MW mine-mouth power plants in Tharparkar through a dedicated subsidiary, Engro Powergen Thar (Private) Limited.

Balochistan 
In June 2019, they announced to invest  to develop a solar power project in Balochistan.

References

Engro Corporation
Companies based in Karachi
Companies listed on the Pakistan Stock Exchange
Energy companies established in 2008
Electric power companies of Pakistan
Pakistani companies established in 2008